This is a list of schools in Plymouth in the English county of Devon.

State-funded schools

Primary schools

Austin Farm Academy
Beechwood Primary Academy
Boringdon Primary School
The Cathedral School of St Mary
Chaddlewood Primary School
College Road Primary School
Compton CE Primary School
Drake Primary Academy
Eggbuckland Vale Primary School
Elburton Primary School
Ernesettle Community School
Ford Primary School
Glen Park Primary School
Goosewell Primary Academy
High Street Primary Academy
High View School
Holy Cross RC Primary School
Hooe Primary Academy
Hyde Park Infants' School
Hyde Park Junior School
Keyham Barton RC Primary School
Knowle Primary School
Laira Green Primary School
Leigham Primary School
Lipson Vale Primary School
Manadon Vale Primary School
Marine Academy Plymouth
Marlborough Primary Academy
Mary Dean's CE Primary School
Mayflower Academy
Millbay Academy
Montpelier Primary School
Morice Town Primary Academy
Morley Meadow Primary School
Mount Street Primary School
Mount Wise Community Primary School
Oakwood Primary Academy
Old Priory Junior Academy
Oreston Community Academy
Pennycross Primary School
Pilgrim Primary Academy
Plaistow Hill Infant School
Plympton St Mary's CE Infant School
Plympton St Maurice Primary School
Pomphlett Primary School
Prince Rock Primary School
Riverside Community Primary School
St Andrew's CE Primary School
St Budeaux Foundation CE Junior School
St Edward's CE Primary School
St George's CE Primary Academy 
St Joseph's RC Primary School
St Maththews CE Primary Academy 
St Paul's RC Primary School
St Peter's CE Primary School
St Peter's RC Primary School
Salisbury Road Primary School
Shakespeare Primary School
Stoke Damerel Primary School
Stuart Road Primary School
Thornbury Primary School
Tor Bridge Primary School
Victoria Road Primary
Weston Mill Community Primary Academy
Whitleigh Community Primary School
Widewell Primary Academy
Widey Court Primary School
Woodfield Primary School
Woodford Primary School
Yealmpstone Farm Primary School

Non-selective secondary schools

All Saints Church of England Academy
Coombe Dean School
Eggbuckland Community College
Hele's School
Lipson Co-operative Academy
Marine Academy Plymouth
Millbay Academy
Notre Dame Catholic School
Plympton Academy
Plymstock School
St Boniface's Catholic College
Scott Medical and Healthcare College
Sir John Hunt Community Sports College
Stoke Damerel Community College
Tor Bridge High
UTC Plymouth

Grammar schools
Devonport High School for Boys
Devonport High School for Girls
Plymouth High School for Girls

Special and alternative schools

ACE Schools
Brook Green Centre for Learning
Cann Bridge School
Courtlands School
Longcause Community Special School
Mill Ford School
Mount Tamar School 
Woodlands School

Further education
City College Plymouth
Plymouth College of Art

Independent schools

Primary and preparatory schools
Fletewood School
King's School

Senior and all-through schools
OneSchool Global UK
Plymouth College

Plymouth
Schools in Plymouth, Devon